Bojidar Spiriev (1932–2010) was a Bulgarian hydrogeological engineer and athletics statistician credited with the creation of the official IAAF Scoring Tables in Athletics.

Biography
Spiriev was born in Nevrokop (today Gotse Delchev), a town in southwestern Bulgaria. He married Hungarian long jump champion Irén Kun in 1961 and moved to Hungary. However, it was not until 1992 that he was granted Hungarian citizenship. He is the father of former athlete and athletics manager Attila and chess player Peter.

Spiriev created the "Hungarian" Scoring Tables of Athletics in 1979, which later turned into the official IAAF Scoring Tables. Together with Attila they created the World Rankings system in athletics. They also founded All-Athletics.com, the most comprehensive worldwide athletics database website.

Spiriev died on 10 January 2010 at the age of 77.

References

Bojidar Spiriev (1932–2010)

Bulgarian statisticians
Bulgarian expatriates in Hungary
1923 births
2010 deaths
People from Gotse Delchev
Macedonian Bulgarians
Hydrologists
Sport of athletics people
Bulgarian emigrants to Hungary